The 2013–14 Tulsa Golden Hurricane men's basketball team represented the University of Tulsa during the 2013–14 NCAA Division I men's basketball season. The Golden Hurricane, led by second year head coach Danny Manning, played their home games at the Reynolds Center and were members of Conference USA. They finished the season 21–13, 13–3 in C-USA play to finish in a four way tie for the C-USA regular season championship. They were champions of the C-USA tournament to earn an automatic bid to the NCAA tournament where they lost in the second round to UCLA.

This was their final year in C-USA as they moved to the American Athletic Conference in July 2014.

Roster

Schedule

|-
!colspan=9 style="background:#084c9e; color:#CFB53B;"| Exhibition

|-
!colspan=9 style="background:#084c9e; color:#CFB53B;"| Regular season

|-
!colspan=9 style="background:#084c9e; color:#CFB53B;"| Conference USA tournament

|-
!colspan=9 style="background:#084c9e; color:#CFB53B;"| NCAA tournament

References

Tulsa Golden Hurricane men's basketball seasons
Tulsa
Tulsa
2013 in sports in Oklahoma
2014 in sports in Oklahoma